Emily Fair Oster (born February 14, 1980) is an American economist and author. She is currently the JJE Goldman Sachs University Professor of Economics and International and Public Affairs at Brown University, where she has taught since 2015. Her research interests span from development economics and health economics to research design and experimental methodology. Her research has received exposure among non-economists through The Wall Street Journal, the book SuperFreakonomics, and her 2007 TED Talk.

Oster is the author of three books, Expecting Better, The Family Firm, and Cribsheet, which discuss a data-driven approach to decision-making in pregnancy and parenting.

Early life
Oster was born on February 14, 1980, the daughter of economists Sharon Oster and Ray Fair. When she was two years old, Oster's parents noticed that she talked to herself in her crib after they left her room. They placed a tape recorder in her room in order to find out what she was saying and passed the tapes on to a linguist and psychologist with whom they were friends. Analysis of Oster's speech showed that her language was much more complex when she was alone than when interacting with adults. This led to her being the subject of a series of academic papers which were collectively published as a compendium in 1989 titled Narratives from the Crib. The book was reprinted in 2006, with a foreword by Oster.

Career
After earning a B.A. and Ph.D. from Harvard in 2002 and 2006 respectively, Oster taught at the University of Chicago Booth School of Business. She later moved to Brown University, where she is Professor of Economics.

Oster's research focuses generally on development economics and health. In 2005, Oster published a dissertation for her economics Ph.D. from Harvard University, which suggested that the unusually high ratio of men to women in China was partially due to the effects of the hepatitis B virus. "Hepatitis B and the Case of the Missing Women," pointed to findings that suggested areas with high hepatitis B rates tended to have higher male-to female birth ratios. Oster argued that the fact that hepatitis B can cause a woman to conceive male children more often than female, accounted for a bulk of the "missing women" in Amartya Sen's 1990 essay, "More Than 100 Million Women Are Missing." Oster noted that the use of hepatitis B vaccine in 1982 led to a sharp decline in the male-to-female birth ratio. Sen's essay had attributed the "missing women" to societal discrimination against girls and women in the form of the allocation of health, educational, and food resources. In April 2008, Oster released a working paper "Hepatitis B Does Not Explain Male-Biased Sex Ratios in China" in which she evaluated new data, which showed that her original research was incorrect. Freakonomics author Steven Levitt saw this as a sign of integrity.

In a 2007 TED Talk, Oster discussed the spread of HIV in Africa, applying a cost-benefit analysis to the question of why African men have been slow to change their sexual behavior.

Oster's work on television and female empowerment in India was featured in Steve Levitt's second book, SuperFreakonomics.

Books
In her book, Expecting Better, Oster discusses the data behind common pregnancy "rules" and argues many of them are misleading. On the guideline of avoiding alcohol consumption during pregnancy, she argues that there is no evidence that (low) levels of alcohol consumption by pregnant women adversely affect their children. This claim, however, has drawn criticism from the National Organization on Fetal Alcohol Syndrome and others. As of March 2019, the book has sold over 100,000 copies.

Her second book, Cribsheet, was published in April 2019 and was a New York Times best seller. It evaluates and reviews the research on a variety of parenting topics relating to infants and toddlers, including breastfeeding, safe sleep guidelines, sleep training, and potty training. The week of April 28, 2019, Cribsheet was also the best selling book in Washington, DC according to the Post.

Her third book, The Family Firm: A Data-Driven Guide to Better Decision Making in the Early School Years, applies to school age children.  A review discusses the relationship of her parenting approach to more permissive parenting ideas dating back to the pre-Reagan era.

COVID-19 and schools 
Oster was an advocate for opening schools during the coronavirus epidemic, spearheading a project to collect data on the spread of coronavirus in schools, and appearing frequently in media discussing why schools should open. In early October 2020, she wrote an influential and much cited article in The Atlantic entitled "Schools Aren't Super-Spreaders" which inspired numerous articles. Secretary of Education Betsy DeVos and the CDC cited Oster's work as a reason to open schools during the pandemic. In August 2020, Oster launched a dashboard compiling information on the spread of COVID-19 in schools. Critics of Oster's dashboard said it had methodological problems that they believe undermine its usefulness.

In September 2021, Oster launched the Covid-19 School Data Hub which includes information on virtual and in person status of schools across 31 states. According to The New York Times, the data hub is "one of the most comprehensive efforts yet to document how schools operated during the pandemic."

On October 31, 2022, The Atlantic published an opinion piece written by Oster in which she called for "amnesty" following the COVID-19 pandemic, citing the "tremendous uncertainty" surrounding topics such as the virus, face masks, social distancing, school closures and COVID-19 vaccines.

Personal life
Emily is the daughter of Sharon Oster and Ray Fair, both professors of economics at Yale University. She married Jesse Shapiro, also an economist, in June 2006, and they have two children.

References

External links
Oster's research home page (Brown)
Emily Oster: What do we really know about the spread of AIDS? TED, March 2007
 The Future of Economics Isn't So Dismal New York Times, January 10, 2007
Preventing HIV in Africa: Understanding Sexual Behavior Change  Video Interview

Interview with Emily Oster External Medicine Podcast Interview 2021
Bad Moms with Emily Oster Honestly with Bari Weiss Podcast 2023

American women economists
Health economists
1980 births
Living people
Harvard University alumni
University of Chicago faculty
Brown University faculty
Place of birth missing (living people)
American women non-fiction writers
21st-century American economists
21st-century American non-fiction writers
21st-century American women writers